Classic Songs is the second compilation album by James Taylor. Only available in Europe it was, for a long time, the only compilation album to feature original versions of Taylor's classics. It spanned from his original work to his That's Why I'm Here album from 1985.

Track listing 
All songs by James Taylor except where indicated.

Side 1
 "Fire and Rain" – 3:25
 "Mexico" – 3:00
 "You've Got a Friend" (Carole King) – 4:30
 "How Sweet It Is (To Be Loved by You)" (Holland–Dozier–Holland) – 3:36
 "Carolina in My Mind" – 4:00
 "Something in the Way She Moves" – 3:09
 "Shower the People" – 4:32
 "Sweet Baby James" – 2:52

Side 2
 "That's Why I'm Here" – 3:38
 "Everyday" (Holly, Petty) – 3:12
 "Up on the Roof" (Goffin, King) – 4:20
 "Your Smiling Face" – 2:42
 "Her Town Too" (Souther, Taylor, Wachtel) – 4:25
 "Handy Man" (Blackwell, Jones) – 3:17
 "Don't Let Me Be Lonely Tonight" – 2:36
 "Only a Dream in Rio"	– 4:58

Charts

Certifications

References

1987 greatest hits albums
James Taylor compilation albums
Warner Records compilation albums